The St. Ann Cathedral is located in the town of Gagnoa, in the African country of Ivory Coast, and is one of that country's most important religious buildings. It was formerly an old parish church, but became a cathedral of the Roman Catholic Church on February 3, 1957. Monsignor Barthélémy Djabla was buried here in 2008.

It serves as the center of the Archdiocese of Gagnoa (Archidiocèse de Gagnoa; Archidioecesis Gagnoaënsis) one of the four existing in Ivory Coast, and the center of the ecclesiastical province of Gagnoa.

History

See also
Roman Catholicism in Ivory Coast

References

Roman Catholic cathedrals in Ivory Coast
Gagnoa
Buildings and structures in Gôh-Djiboua District